Nadodi Mannan is a 1995 Indian Tamil-language drama film directed by Manivasagam. The film stars R. Sarathkumar and Meena. It was released on 19 August 1995, and failed at the box office.

Plot 

Ram Sundar, also known as Ramu, is a rich businessman and he is married to Meenakshi. They have an arrogant daughter Priya. Ramesh, a graduate who works as a car driver, falls in love with Priya and lies to her that he is a rich man. They eventually fall in love with each other until Priya knows the truth. So, Ramu tries to reason with her and tells his daughter about his past.

In the past, Meenakshi was the daughter of a rich businessman while Ramu repaired slippers in the street with his friend Ponnusamy. One day, Ramu saved Meenakshi from goons and Meenakshi fell in love with him. Ponnusamy and Meenakshi made a plan to seduce Ramu. Under the name of Mayil Aatha, Meenakshi has finally won Ramu's heart and he reciprocated her love. Meenakshi's father didn't accept for the marriage, so Meenakshi rejected her rich life and she married Ramu. Thereafter, Ramu worked hard and he became one of the richest men in India.

Priya understands that money is not the only measure of success in life. Afterwards, Ramu clashes with Krishnamoorthy, an influential man.

Cast 

R. Sarathkumar as Ramu (Ram Sundar),shrieff of city
Meena as Meenakshi as mother and Priya as daughter
Raghuvaran as Krishnamoorthy
Goundamani as Ponnusamy
Senthil
Vignesh as Ramesh
Alphonsa as Dilruba
Lalitha Kumari as Kuyil Aatha
Vennira Aadai Moorthy
Kitty as Meenakshi's father,priya's grand father,Governor of tamil nadu
Dhanush
Suryakanth
Oru Viral Krishna Rao
Chandrasekhar
Raviraj
Tiruppur Ramasamy as Ramesh's uncle

Soundtrack 
The music was composed by Deva, with lyrics written by Kalidasan.

Reception
R. P. R. of Kalki called the film showcasing the political ambitions of Sarathkumar while criticising the screenplay as slow like a art film.

References

External links 
 

1990s Tamil-language films
1995 drama films
1995 films
Films directed by Manivasagam
Indian drama films